Kukni is a rural locality (a selo) in Khurinsky Selsoviet, Laksky District, Republic of Dagestan, Russia. The population was 63 as of 2010. There are 2 streets.

Geography 
Kukni is located 13 km southeast of Kumukh (the district's administrative centre) by road, on the left bank of the Khunnikh River. Khoykhi and Kani are the nearest rural localities.

Nationalities 
Laks live there.

References 

Rural localities in Laksky District